The 2014 Western Sydney Wanderers FC W-League season was the club's third participation in the W-League, since the club's formation in 2012.

Players

Squad information

Transfers in

Transfers out

Technical staff

Competitions

W-League

Fixtures

League table

Results summary

Results by round

Goal scorers

Awards
 Player of the Week (Round 2) - Keelin Winters
 Player of the Week (Round 7) - Hannah Beard

References

External links
 Official Website

Western Sydney Wanderers FC (A-League Women) seasons
Western Sydney Wanderers